Nanco is a surname. Notable people with the surname include:

Chris Nanco (born 1995), Canadian footballer
Ninco Nanco (1833–1864), Italian brigand